"Ciao ciao" is a song by Italian band La Rappresentante di Lista. It was written by band members Veronica Lucchesi and Dario Mangiaracina with Roberto Calabrese, Roberto Cammarata, Carmelo Drago and Simone Privitera.

It was released by Woodworm and Numero Uno on 2 February 2022 as the second single from the digital re-issue of My Mamma. The song was the band's entry for the Sanremo Music Festival 2022, the 72nd edition of Italy's musical festival which doubles also as a selection of the act for the Eurovision Song Contest, where it placed 7th in the grand final. "Ciao ciao" peaked at number 3 on the Italian Singles Chart and was certified triple platinum by FIMI.

Music video
The music video for the song was released on YouTube on the same day of the single's release. It was directed by Simone Rovellini and filmed at the BigMotion Studio in Cologno Monzese, Milan. The video also includes a cameo of Italian-American journalist Peter Gomez.

Personnel
Credits adapted from Tidal.
 Veronica Lucchesi – associated performer, composer, lyricist, vocals
 Dario Mangiaracina – associated performer, composer, lyricist
 Roberto Calabrese – composer
 Roberto Cammarata – composer
 Carmelo Drago – composer
 Papa D – producer
 Piccolo Cobra – producer
 Simone Privitera "Simon Says" – producer, composer

Track listing

Charts

Weekly charts

Year-end charts

Certifications

References

2022 singles
2022 songs
La Rappresentante di Lista songs
Sanremo Music Festival songs